The Melon Music Award for Artist of the Year is an accolade presented by Kakao M at the annual Melon Music Awards. The Artist of the Year award was first given at its inaugural online ceremony in 2005; since 2009, it consists of the most prestigious awards given at the event, alongside Album of the Year and Song of the Year.

Winners and nominees

Artists with multiple nominations 

8 nominations
 IU

6 nominations
 Exo
 BTS

3 nominations
 Big Bang
 Beast

2 nominations
 Zico
 Girls' Generation
 Shinee
 2NE1
 TVXQ
 Lim Young-woong

Artists with multiple wins 
3 wins

 BTS

2 wins

 IU
 Exo
 Beast
 Girls' Generation

See also 

 Mnet Asian Music Award for Artist of the Year

Notes

References 

artist of the year